The Plum Mariko Memorial Show was an annual professional wrestling event held in 1997 and 1998 in memory of Plum Mariko featuring representatives from joshi promotions All Japan Women's Pro-Wrestling, J'd, JWP Joshi Puroresu, Ladies Legend Pro-Wrestling and NEO as well as puroresu promotions Big Japan Pro Wrestling, Frontier Martial-Arts Wrestling, IWA Japan and Yoshiaki Yatsu's Super Pro Wrestling Federation. The first show was held in Tokyo, Japan at the Ota Ward Gym on October 30, 1997, and was attended by 2,500 fans. The main event featured Cutie Suzuki and Dynamite Kansai defeating Mayumi Ozaki in a "handicap" match. On the undercard, AJW's Kaoru Ito and Nanae Takahashi defeated Kumiko Maekawa and Momoe Nakanishi and FMW's Crusher Maedomari defeated Kaoru Nakayama.

A second show was held the following year at the Ota Ward Gym on August 13, 1998, with 2,703 in attendance. Mayumi Ozaki and Devil Masami defeated Cutie Suzuki and Dynamite Kansai in the main event and, on the undercard, Manami Toyota and Kumiko Maekawa defeated Nanae Takahashi and Momoe Nakanishi and AJW's Hikari Fukuoka, Kanako Motoya and Harumi Yagi defeated Rieko Amano, Tomoko Kuzumi and Tomoko Miyaguchi.

Show results

First Annual Plum Mariko Memorial Show
October 30, 1997 in Tokyo, Japan (Ota Ward Gym)

Second Annual Plum Mariko Memorial Show
August 13, 1998 in Tokyo, Japan (Ota Ward Gym)

References

All Japan Women's Pro-Wrestling
Professional wrestling memorial shows
Women's professional wrestling shows
1997 in professional wrestling
1998 in professional wrestling
Events in Tokyo
October 1997 events in Asia
August 1998 events in Asia
Professional wrestling in Tokyo